Don Barker (born ) is an Australian actor, who has appeared in films, television theatre and radio, he best known for his role in the police procedural series Homicide as Detective Sargeant Harry White (which he reprised in an episode of Bluey), and briefly in the prison drama Prisoner as social worker Bill Jackson.

Career
Barker started his career in theatre in 1960, but perhaps is best known having appeared in many TV series, mini-series and television movies since the late 1960s, he has also appeared in the feature films including Dawn!, Gallipoli, Playing Beattie Bow and Rabbit-Proof Fence 

TV credits include: Cop Shop, Division 4, Matlock Police, Certain Women, The Box, The Restless Years, Bellamy, Mother and Son, A Country Practice, Blue Heelers, McLeod's Daughters, and City Homicide. He is also well known for his appearance in a number of television commercials including the 1970s campaign for South Australian-based Coopers Brewery, promoting the stout and lemonade mix known as a portagaf. Apart from his television and film roles Barker has appeared in over 110 theatre productions from 1961 and 2008, and has also worked as a director in theatre.

Selected filmography

Film (features and telefilms)

Television

References

External links
 

1940 births
Living people
Australian male film actors
Australian male soap opera actors
Male actors from Adelaide
20th-century Australian male actors
21st-century Australian male actors